The Moors, Bishop's Waltham is a  biological Site of Special Scientific Interest in Bishop's Waltham in Hampshire.

These unimproved wet meadows and alder carr drain into Mill Pond at the centre of the site. The meadows have a rich and diverse flora, dominated by greater pond sedge in wetter areas, while there are plants such as purple moor-grass and meadow foxtail in drier parts.

References

 

Local Nature Reserves in Hampshire
Sites of Special Scientific Interest in Hampshire